Shenkui is a traditional Chinese medicinal term in which the individual suffers withdrawal like symptoms including painful brain fag syndrome, chills, nausea, and even flu-like symptoms with anxiety, believed to be caused by an orgasm and loss of semen. The symptoms can last weeks to months after a single orgasm. And in Traditional Chinese Medicine, shen (kidney) is the reservoir of vital essence in semen (ching) and k’uei signifies deficiency. 

Shenkui or shen-k'uei is one of several Chinese culture-bound syndromes locally ascribed to getting stuck in yang and the needing of yin to rebalance Yang (Chinese: 陽). Semen is believed to be "lost" through sexual activity or masturbation, nocturnal emissions, "white urine" which is believed to contain semen, or other mechanisms. Symptoms within the Chinese diagnostic system include painful brain fog, chills, dizziness, backache, tiredness, weakness, insomnia, frequent dreams, and complaints of sexual dysfunction (such as premature ejaculation or impotence). From an ethnopsychiatric perspective, additional symptoms are preoccupation with sexual performance, potential semen loss, and bodily complaints.

Signs and symptoms
Symptoms include:
 Withdrawal Symptoms
 Brain fog
 Chills 
 Dizziness
 Backache
 Tiredness
 Weakness
 Insomnia
 Frequent dreams
 Sexual dysfunctions; premature ejaculation or impotence.

Origin
Chinese folk beliefs hold that the Yin (Chinese: 陰) represents femininity, slow, cold, wet, passive, water, the moon, and nighttime. And that Yang represents masculinity, fast, dry, hot, aggressive, fire, the sun, and daytime.

Loss of yang would result in an abundance of Yin. It is also believed that if a case of Shenkui is severe enough, it could result in death. 
Informal or incomplete education about sexual health in China leaves a lot of room for folk beliefs to thrive. Often, advertisements support such beliefs to encourage use of traditional medicines. In Chinese folk beliefs, the loss of semen can cause imbalance in the body, leaving you with aches and pains and trouble performing.

Treatment
Many people who believe they suffer from shenkui seek out traditional medicinal cures thought to restore balance to yin and yang. An affected person may also go to a medical clinic that specializes in Western sexual health. If no medical problems are found, therapy may be used to help deal with stress, or anxiety medicines may be used.

See also
Postorgasmic illness syndrome
Cross-cultural psychiatry
Koro
Dhat syndrome

References

Culture-bound syndromes
Traditional Chinese medicine
Sexual health